The Tulane Green Wave college football team represents Tulane University in the American Athletic Conference (AAC). The Green Wave compete as part of the NCAA Division I Football Bowl Subdivision. The program has had 40 head coaches since it began play during the 1893 season. Since December 2015, Willie Fritz has served as head coach at Tulane.

Twelve coaches have led Tulane in postseason bowl games: R. R. Brown, Bernie Bierman, Ted Cox, Red Dawson, Jim Pittman, Bennie Ellender, Larry Smith, Vince Gibson, Mack Brown, Chris Scelfo, Curtis Johnson, and Fritz. Five of those coaches also won conference championships: Cox, Dawson, and Henry Frnka each captured one as a member of the Southeastern Conference; Tommy Bowden captured one as a member of Conference USA; and Fritz one as a member of the AAC.

Clark Shaughnessy is the leader in seasons coached with 11 years as head coach and games won with 59. H. T. Summersgill has the highest winning percentage at 0.909. Fred Sweet and Mark Hutson have the lowest winning percentage of those who have coached more than one game, with 0.000. Of the 40 different head coaches who have led the Green Wave, Shaughnessy, Bierman, Claude Simons Jr., and Brown have been inducted into the College Football Hall of Fame.

Key

Coaches

Notes

References

Tulane Green

Tulane Green Wave football coaches